The Grande Médaille of the French Academy of Sciences, established in 1997, is awarded annually to a researcher who has contributed decisively to the development of science.  It is the most prestigious of the Academy's awards, and is awarded in a different field each year. Its creation results from the combination of the original French Academy of Sciences Lalande Prize of 1802 with the Benjamin Valz Foundation Prize in 1970 and then with another 122 foundation prizes in 1997.

Winners
 2023 - Terence Tao, mathematics 
 2021 - Katalin Karikó, biochemistry 
 2018 - Jocelyn Bell Burnell, astrophysics 
 2016 - Alexander Varshavsky, biochemistry 
 2015 - no award
 2014 - Joel Lebowitz, physics and mathematics 
 2013 - Joan A. Steitz, biochemistry 
 2012 - Adi Shamir, cryptography
 2011 - Avelino Corma Canos, chemistry 
 2010 - Michael Atiyah, mathematics
 2009 - Robert Weinberg, cancer research
 2008 - Susan Solomon, atmospheric chemistry
 2007 - Tomas Hökfelt, who studied neurotransmitters, and discovered their role in depression
 2006 - Peter Goldreich, theoretical astrophysicist and planetary scientist
 2005 - Ronald M. Evans, studied hormone receptors and the control of gene expression
 2004 - David Gross, one of the founders of quantum chromodynamics and the standard model
 2003 - David D. Sabatini, early inventor of electron microscopy techniques for cellular biology, discoverer of signalling peptides
 2002 - Richard Garwin, discovered parity violation in pion decay
 2001 - Albert Eschenmoser, organic chemistry
 2000 - Robert Langlands, mathematics
 1999 - Rene Thomas, molecular biology
 1998 - Leo Kadanoff, physics
 1997 - Jozef Schell, molecular biology of plants

See also 

 List of general science and technology awards

References

Awards established in 1997
Awards of the French Academy of Sciences
1997 establishments in France